Eftyhismenoi mazi or Eutihismenoi Mazi (in English Happy Together) is a Greek comedy TV series that was aired in Mega Channel during the seasons 2007–08 and 2008–09. The screenplay was adapted by the Spanish series Los Serrano. The series stars Giannis Bezos, Katerina Lehou, Dimitris Mavropoulos and others. It was awarded as the best comedy series in "Prosopa" Greek Television Awards for the season 2008–09. It was one of the most successful series and according to television ratings, it was being watched by over 2.000.000 spectators every week.

Plot
Dionisis and Eleni get married, the widower with three sons and the latter with two daughters from their previous marriages. The cohabitation starts to become difficult because the teenage children fell in love with each other. But, the love between them is impossible because they are formally relatives, a fact which creates hectic situations in the family. Among the main roles are also the Kotsabasis family, the friends of Dionisis and Eleni, Spyros, Dionisi's brother, Ifigeneia, Eleni's mother and Dionisi's mother-in-law, Fotis, the waiter at Dionisis and Spyro's beer house and the children's schoolmates.

Cast
 Giannis Bezos as Dionisis Mavrotsoukalos
 Katerina Lehou as Eleni Palaiologou
 Dimitris Mavropoulos as Spyros Mavrotsoukalos
 Petros Bousoulopoulos as Markos Mavrotsoukalos
 Ioanna Pilihou as Eva Palaiologou
 Aris Tsapis as Thanasis Mavrotsoukalos
 Evi Daeli as Ifigeneia "Fifi" Palaiologou
 Tasos Giannopoulos  as Makis Kotsampasis
 Vivi Koka as Vicky Georgiou
 Alexandra Pantelaki as Ifigeneia Saslidou
 Thanasis Tsaltabasis as Fotis Mastrapas-Tsigdemoglou
 Savvas Salipas as Giannakis Mavrotsoukalos
 Kostas Intzegian as Mitsos Kotsampasis
Evi Sarmi as Afroula (season one) 
 Niki Anastasiou as Afroula (season two)

Awards
The series received the below awards in "Prosopa" Greek Television Awards:
Best Comedy TV Series
Best actor (Giannis Bezos)
Best comedy screenplay (Rena Gkika)

References

External links

Greek television sitcoms
Mega Channel original programming
2007 Greek television series debuts
2009 Greek television series endings